Ceresco Township is a township in Blue Earth County, Minnesota, United States. The population was 255 as of the 2000 census.

History
Ceresco Township was organized in 1858, and named after Ceresco, Wisconsin, the former hometown of an early settler.

Geography

Lake
 Porter Lake

Adjacent townships
 Lincoln Township (north)
 Garden City Township (northeast)
 Vernon Center Township (east)
 Shelby Township (southeast)
 Pleasant Mound Township (south)
 Antrim Township, Watonwan County (southwest)
 Fieldon Township, Watonwan County (west)

Cemeteries
The township includes the following cemeteries:  North Saint Johns and Ohio.

Demographics
As of the census of 2000, there were 255 people, 94 households, and 76 families residing in the township. The population density was 7.1 people per square mile (2.7/km). There were 102 housing units at an average density of 2.8/sq mi (1.1/km). The racial makeup of the township was 99.61% White and 0.39% Native American.

There were 94 households, out of which 33.0% had children under the age of 18 living with them, 70.2% were married couples living together, 4.3% had a female householder with no husband present, and 18.1% were non-families. 18.1% of all households were made up of individuals, and 8.5% had someone living alone who was 65 years of age or older. The average household size was 2.71 and the average family size was 3.08.

In the township the population was spread out, with 27.1% under the age of 18, 9.4% from 18 to 24, 16.1% from 25 to 44, 29.4% from 45 to 64, and 18.0% who were 65 years of age or older. The median age was 42 years. For every 100 females, there were 105.6 males.  For every 100 females age 18 and over, there were 106.7 males.

The median income for a household in the township was $38,750, and the median income for a family was $45,104. Males had a median income of $27,500 versus $25,750 for females. The per capita income for the township was $15,412.  About 5.8% of families and 7.9% of the population were below the poverty line, including 9.1% of those under the age of eighteen and none of those 65 or over.

References
 United States National Atlas
 United States Census Bureau 2007 TIGER/Line Shapefiles
 United States Board on Geographic Names (GNIS)

Townships in Blue Earth County, Minnesota
Mankato – North Mankato metropolitan area
Townships in Minnesota